Eureka Airport  is seven miles northwest of Eureka, in Eureka County, Nevada, United States. It is owned by the County of Eureka. The airport is toward the south end of the Diamond Valley.

It is also known as Eureka County Airport and in 2007 it was named Booth Bailey Field, honoring Booth Bailey, a Eureka native and founder of Diamond Aviation, the airport's fixed-base operator.

The FAA's National Plan of Integrated Airport Systems for 2009–2013 categorizes it as a general aviation facility.

Facilities
Eureka Airport covers 800 acres (324 ha) at an elevation of 5,958 feet (1,816 m). Its single runway, 18/36, is 7,300 by 60 feet (2,225 x 18 m) asphalt.

In the year ending August 31, 2012 the airport had 2,000 general aviation aircraft operations, average 166 per month. Three aircraft were then based at this airport, all single-engine.

References

External links 

  from Nevada DOT
 Aerial image as of June 1994 from USGS The National Map
 
 

Airports in Nevada
Buildings and structures in Eureka County, Nevada
Transportation in Eureka County, Nevada